Left gastroepiploic may refer to:
 Left gastroepiploic vein
 Left gastroepiploic artery